Sant'Antonio abate is a Roman Catholic church in Milan, Italy. The church is located on a street running parallel to Via Festa del Perdono.

An older church linked to a hospital had operated at the site under the administration of the Augustinian order. The interior of the church was begun in 1582 in Mannerist style. The current appearance of the church is the work of Francesco Maria Richini, who completed the commission in 1630 for the Theatine order.  The Neoclassical façade was designed in 1832 by the architect Giuseppe Tazzini.

The church contains frescoes by Genovese and his brother Giovanni Battista Carlone; a fresco cycle on the Life of the Virgin by Giulio Cesare Procaccini (1574-1625), a “Nativity” and “Adoration of the Magi” by Pier Francesco Mazzucchelli, and frescoes by Guglielmo Caccia, depicting scenes from the Old Testament.

References

16th-century Roman Catholic church buildings in Italy
Renaissance architecture in Milan
Roman Catholic churches completed in 1630
Roman Catholic churches completed in 1832
Antonio
Tourist attractions in Milan
Theatine churches